The Brno tramway network was the first network of its kind to be put into operation in what is now known as the Czech Republic with its horse tram lines dating back to 1869. Today, Brno is the second largest city in the Czech Republic, after Prague, and its tram network is also the second largest in the country.

The lines not only service the urban area, but also lead to the neighboring town of Modřice located south of Brno. Before construction began on the final leg of the extension in 2008, the entire network was made up of 69.7 km of track. The trams are operated by the City of Brno, Dopravní podnik města Brna (DPMB).

In the Brno dialect of the Czech language (hantec), the word for tram is ‘šalina’. The origins of this word can be traced to the German expression ‘Elektrische Linie’ (electric lines) or 'schallen' (to sound).

History

The first horse tram

Brno was the third largest city of the Austrian part of the former Austro-Hungarian Empire and is today part of the Czech Republic.  It was the first to install a horse-drawn tram service, which began on August 17, 1869. Its route ran to Lažanskýplatz (now called Moravské náměstí, or Moravian Square) in the north of the city center, which was still at the time an independent municipality known as Královo Pole. Its operator was the 'Brno Tramway Society' for passenger and cargo transportation. Initially there were only six cars available and gradually company bought a total of 57 passenger carriages. There was an interruption in horse-drawn tram service between 1875 and 1877.

The second horse tram

The company known today as Brno Tramway was launched in June 1876, with its first route running from the main station to Pisárky. A short while after that, a second route was launched. Both routes were operated only during the summer months.

The steam tram

Steam trams began operation in the system in 1884, under the name Steam Tramway Brno. In the 1900s, the conversion from steam to electrical power began, but steam locomotives were still used, until 1914, to transport goods.

The beginning of the electric tram

The first of the electric rail lines in Brno were put into operation on 21 June 1900. These new lines included 41 railcars and 41 trailers; the latter acquired as many as 12 vehicles from the existing steam trains. These electric lines were operated by the Company Brno. While many other areas transitioned to electric, Brno's steam-powered trams were very efficient and it was more cost-effective to keep the technology unchanged. Cities with less established tram systems were considerably faster in terms of moving to electric power, including Prague and a number of other smaller towns such as Teplice, Liberec, and Olomouc.

Within the first year of operation several new lines were constructed, and soon a total of five lines were offered as part of the system. In 1914, Company Brno began to experience financial difficulties and was taken over by the Austrian electricity delivery group Aktiengesellschaft from Vienna. During World War I further expansion was considered, resulting in the extension of one line to a hospital.

Prime of the Brno tram

After the formation of Czechoslovakia in 1918, the Society of Brno Trams (Společnost brněnských elektrických pouličních drah) was established. The Society's first task was to renovate the cars and tracks that had dilapidated during the war. Beginning in 1924 new lines were built, and a few years later the Society of Brno Trams began to focus on the construction of a second track for far-lane routes.

By 1938, a total of eight routes were in operation. In 1942, the Lokalbahn Brünn-Lösch/Brno-Líšeň, a classic train, was transferred and transformed into a train capable of traveling by a streetcar track.

Future
For a long time, Brno metro and underground railway both have been considered, to create the second metro in Czech Republic after Prague Metro. As of 2022, no plans have been confirmed. No plans have been laid for extending existing lines, however, new sections have been proposed including a turn-off from the line in Starý Lískovec to the University Campus and the extension of the line in Bystrc to the Kamechy housing estate.

Routes

Rolling stock 
Brno tramway network's fleet consists of:

See also

History of Brno
Transport in Brno
List of town tramway systems in the Czech Republic

References

Notes

Bibliography

External links

 Dopravní podnik města Brna, A.S. - Official Site 

Transport in Brno
Brno
600 V DC railway electrification
Brno